Soiron is a village of Wallonia and a district of the municipality of Pepinster, located in the province of Liège, Belgium.

Soiron is a member of the Les Plus Beaux Villages de Wallonie ("The Most Beautiful Villages of Wallonia") association.

References

External links

Former municipalities of Liège Province
Pepinster